"If I Were You" is a song written and recorded by Canadian country music artist Terri Clark. It was released in February 1996 as the third single from her album Terri Clark. The song reached number 1 on the RPM Country Tracks chart in June 1996.

Music video
The music video was directed by Michael Merriman and premiered in February 1996.

Chart performance
"If I Were You" debuted at number 58 on the U.S. Billboard Hot Country Singles & Tracks for the week of March 9, 1996.

Year-end charts

References

1996 singles
Terri Clark songs
Songs written by Terri Clark
Song recordings produced by Keith Stegall
Mercury Records singles
1995 songs